A die shot or die photography is a photo or recording of the layout of an integrated circuit, showings its design with any packaging removed. A die shot can be compared with the cross-section of an (almost) two-dimensional computer chip, on which the design and construction of various tracks and components can be clearly seen. Due to the high complexity of modern computer chips, die-shots are often displayed colourfully, with various parts coloured using special lighting or even manually.

Methods 
A die shot is a picture of a computer chip without its housing. There are two ways to capture such a chip "naked" on a photo; by either taking the photo before a chip is packaged or by removing its package.

Avoiding the package 
Taking a photo before the chip ends up in a housing is typically preserved to the chip manufacturer, because the chip is packed fairly quickly in the production process to protect the sensitive very small parts against external influences. However, manufacturers may be reluctant to share die shots to prevent competitors from easily gaining insight into the technological progress and complexity of a chip.

Removing the package 
Removing the housing from a chip is typically a chemical process - a chip is so small and the parts are so microscopic that opening a housing (also named delidding) with tools such as saws, sanders or dremels could damage the chip in such a way that a die shot is no longer or less useful. For example, sulphuric acid can be used to dissolve the plastic housing of a chip. This is not a harmless process - sulphuric acid can cause a lot of health damage to people, animals and the environment. Chips are immersed in a glass jar with sulphuric acid, after which the sulphuric acid is boiled for up to 45 minutes at a temperature of 337 degrees Celsius. Once the plastic housing has decayed, there may be other processes to remove leftover carbon, such as with a hot bath of concentrated nitric acid. After this, the contents of a chip are relatively exposed and a picture can be made of the chip with macrophotography or microphotography.

Gallery

References

External links 
 "Hardwarecop CPU Museum" - a website showing die shots sorted per ship-series.
 YouTube-video explaining how one can take a die shot.

Integrated circuits
Photography